HAQ or Haq may refer to:

Places
 Haq, Iran, a village in West Azerbaijan Province, Iran
 Haq Rural District, in West Azerbaijan Province, Iran

Other uses
 Haq (film), a 2010 Malaysian film
 Haq Movement, a political organization in Bahrain
 Haq TV, a Pakistani television station
 4-Hydroxy-2-alkylquinoline, a signaling molecule
 Al-Haq, a Palestinian human rights organization
 Ha language (ISO 639-2 code: haq), of Tanzania
 Hanimaadhoo International Airport, in the Maldives

See also
 Haqq (حقّ), the Arabic word for truth
 Haqq (surname), for the surname Haq
 H.A.Q.Q., a 2019 music album by Liturgy
 Hack (disambiguation)
 Haque (disambiguation)